The communauté de communes de la Petite Creuse  was located in the Creuse département of the Limousin  region of central France. It was created in January 2003. It was dissolved in 2013.

Participants 
The communauté comprised the following 9 communes:

Bétête
Châtelus-Malvaleix
Clugnat
Genouillac
Jalesches
Ladapeyre
Roches
Saint-Dizier-les-Domaines
Tercillat

Policies and objectives 
The Community of communes aims to involve and unite the local communes with a view to establishing joint development projects and the development of space. 
It aims to exercise its powers in the interest of the community in: Spatial planning, economic development, tourism, housing and the protection and enhancement of the environment as well as local roads, sport and culture.

See also
Communes of the Creuse department

References  

Petite Creuse